Vasily Sergeyevich Michurin (15 July 1916 – 16 December 2021) was a Red Army man of the 13th Army and later a colonel in the Soviet Army. He was the last of the surviving Hero of the Soviet Union to receive this title for the Winter War and before the start of the Great Patriotic War.

References 

1916 births
2021 deaths
People from Kostroma Oblast
People from Buysky Uyezd
Communist Party of the Soviet Union members
Soviet colonels
Belarusian military personnel
Soviet military personnel of the Winter War
Soviet military personnel of World War II
Heroes of the Soviet Union
Recipients of the Order of Lenin
Recipients of the Order of the Red Banner
Belarusian centenarians
Men centenarians